The Red River is a tributary of the Kechika River in the far north of British Columbia, Canada, flowing east to meet the Kechika from headwaters in the Cassiar Mountains. In its middle reaches it forms the boundary between the Dease Plateau (N) and the Cassiar Mountains (S) and for its final stretch it crosses part of the Liard Plain.

See also
List of rivers in British Columbia

References

Rivers of British Columbia
Northern Interior of British Columbia
Cassiar Mountains
Cassiar Land District